The 1999–2000 Slovak Cup was the 31st season of Slovakia's annual knock-out cup competition and the seventh since the independence of Slovakia. It began on 25 July 1999 with Preliminary round and ended on 8 May 2000 with the Final. The winners of the competition earned a place in the first round of the UEFA Cup. Slovan Bratislava were the defending champions.

Preliminary round
The first legs were played on 25 July 1999. The second legs were played on 4 August 1999.

|}

First round
The games were played on 21 and 22 September 1999.

|}

Second round
The games were played on 12 October 1999.

|}

Quarter-finals
The games were played on 26 October 1999.

|}

Semi-finals
The first legs were played on 4 April 2000. The second legs were played on 18 April 2000.

|}

Final

References

External links
profutbal.sk 
Results on RSSSF

Slovak Cup seasons
Slovak Cup
Cup